Diocese of Kimberley may refer to:

 the Roman Catholic Diocese of Kimberley
 the Anglican Diocese of Kimberley and Kuruman